Judith is a 1966 drama film made by Command Productions, Cumulus Productions and Paramount Pictures. It was directed by Daniel Mann and produced by Kurt Unger from a screenplay by John Michael Hayes, based on the story by Lawrence Durrell. The music score was by Sol Kaplan and the cinematography by John Wilcox.

The film stars Sophia Loren, Peter Finch and Jack Hawkins.

Plot

In Palestine shortly before the end of the British mandate, the Haganah has learned that a former German tank commander, General Gustav Schiller, is teaching the Arabs battle tactics, but they are unable to locate him. Then they learn of the existence of his Jewish former wife, Judith Auerbach Schiller, and arrange for her to be smuggled into Palestine via the port of Haifa. She is placed in the care of Aaron Stein, a Haganah commander, at a kibbutz.

Schiller had abandoned his wife during the war and took away their son. Judith was then sent to the Dachau concentration camp, where she was forced to serve in an officers' brothel, but survived.

Judith dislikes the rigours of kibbutz life, and is unable to tell the kibbutz leaders anything about Schiller, but Stein hopes that she can at least identify him. He "suggests" that she ask the local army commander, Major Lawton, to help her. Judith travels to Haifa to see him and pleads with him to hand over the file on Schiller, which he eventually does. It turns out that Schiller was last known to be in Damascus, Syria.

Judith, Stein and a colleague are smuggled into Damascus, and after days of searching, they find Schiller. As they are about to capture him, Judith shoots and wounds him. Schiller is smuggled back to Palestine and interrogated, but he refuses to give any information. Left alone with Judith, he pleads for mercy. But as the kibbutz comes under attack by Arab forces, he finally reveals the battle plans, and also tells Judith that he knows the whereabouts of their son, Karl. The room in which he is being kept is bombed and Schiller is killed. Aaron promises that he will help Judith find her son.

Cast
 Sophia Loren as Judith Auerbach
 Peter Finch as Aaron Stein
 Jack Hawkins as Major Lawton
 Hans Verner as Gustav Schiller
 Frank Wolff as Eli
 Shraga Friedman as Nathan
 André Morell as Haim
 Zaharira Harifai as Dr. Rachel
 Arnoldo Foà as Interrogator
 Joseph Gross as Yanek
 Roger Beaumont as Ze'ev
 Zipora Peled as Hannah
 Peter Burton as Conklin
 Terence Alexander as Carstairs
 Daniel Ocko as Arab Guide

Release
The film premiered on January 20, 1966 at Radio City Music Hall.

Reception
New York Times film critic Bosley Crowther, wrote that the film "... comes out as a disappointing picture, more lurid and loud than lustrous," and that the film is more fiction than an illusion. However, he praised Loren's acting: "She is lending her name and her presence to a routine cloak-and-dagger film that, without her, would get no more attention—and would deserve no more—than a quickie on the lower half of a double bill."

The film has a 20% "fresh" rating on Rotten Tomatoes, based on five reviews.

References

External links
 
 
 
 
 Judith on Letterboxd
 Judith (movie) on the Digital collections of Younes and Soraya Nazarian Library, University of Haifa

1966 films
1966 drama films
British drama films
Films directed by Daniel Mann
Films about the Arab–Israeli conflict
Israeli–Palestinian conflict films
Films set in Mandatory Palestine
Films set in 1947
Films set in 1948
Films with screenplays by John Michael Hayes
Films scored by Sol Kaplan
1960s English-language films
1960s British films
English-language drama films